Raymond Lewis Hare (November 21, 1917 – June 2, 1975) was an American football running back in the National Football League for the Washington Redskins and the Brooklyn Tigers.  Hare also played in the All-America Football Conference for the New York Yankees.  He attended Gonzaga University.

External links 
 

1917 births
1975 deaths
Gridiron football people from Saskatchewan
Canadian emigrants to the United States
American football running backs
Gonzaga University alumni
Washington Redskins players
Brooklyn Tigers players
New York Yankees (AAFC) players
Sportspeople from North Battleford
People from Yamhill County, Oregon
United States Army personnel of World War II
United States Army soldiers
Canadian players of American football